Skull Gang is the self-titled debut studio album by American hip hop group Skull Gang, released on February 24, 2009, on Skull Gang Entertainment. The first single released from the album was "Secret" (Feat Jim Jones).

Track listing

References 

2009 debut albums